Allan C. Glover (9 August 1900 – 1984) was a South Australian artist noted for his etchings.

History
Glover was born in South Australia the eldest son of John Sydney Glover (1875 – 30 August 1919) of Duke Street, Kensington.
He attended the South Australian School of Arts and Crafts from 1922 to, studying painting under May Grigg and etching under John C. Goodchild. In 1925 he was admitted to the South Australian Society of Arts as an associate member, and exhibited with the Society the following year. In 1927 he staged his first one-man exhibitions.

He served as president of the Royal South Australian Society of Arts 1956–1968.

References 

Australian etchers
Australian printers
1900 births
1984 deaths
19th-century Australian painters
19th-century Australian male artists
20th-century Australian painters
20th-century Australian male artists
20th-century printmakers
Australian male painters